Valeriy Zhemeza is a Soviet sprint canoer who competed in the mid-1970s. He won a bronze medal in the K-2 10000 m event at the 1975 ICF Canoe Sprint World Championships in Belgrade.

References

Living people
Soviet male canoeists
Year of birth missing (living people)
Russian male canoeists
ICF Canoe Sprint World Championships medalists in kayak